Marie Catherine Vasa (1670 – after 12 December 1672) was a Polish noblewoman as the legitimated daughter of the former king of Poland, John Casimir Vasa, and his mistress and morganatic wife Claudine Françoise Mignot.

On 12 December 1672 her father gave her 15.000 livres. When she grew up she went to the Order of the Visitation of Holy Mary. She was born in France, and died in France.

Sources
Zygmunt Wdowiszewski: Genealogia Jagiellonów i Domu Wazów w Polsce, Kraków 2005.

House of Vasa
1670 births
Year of death unknown
Illegitimate children of Polish monarchs